The Parkman Tavern is an historic tavern (now a private residence) at 20 Powder Mill Road in Concord, Massachusetts.  It is a -story timber-frame structure, five bays wide, with a side-gable roof, large central chimney, and clapboard siding.  It is estimated to have been built in the late 17th or early 18th century, by a member of the locally prominent Wheeler family.  In the late 18th century it was purchased by William Parkman, great-uncle to historian Francis Parkman, who operated a tavern on the premises.

The house was listed on the National Register of Historic Places in 1979.

See also
List of the oldest buildings in Massachusetts
National Register of Historic Places listings in Concord, Massachusetts

References

Houses completed in 1659
Houses in Concord, Massachusetts
Houses on the National Register of Historic Places in Middlesex County, Massachusetts
Taverns in Massachusetts
Drinking establishments on the National Register of Historic Places in Massachusetts
1659 establishments in Massachusetts
First period houses in Massachusetts (1620–1659)
Greek Revival architecture in Massachusetts